Elackad  is a village in Kottayam district in the state of Kerala, India.

Demographics
 India census, Elackad had a population of 14088 with 7022 males and 7066 females.

Location
Elackad is a village in Meenachil Taluk, just three kilometers away from Kuravilangad. Elackad has two famous Devi Temple called Kakkinikadu Devi Temple and Vazhappillikavu. There is also a Roman Catholic St. Mary's Church at the center. Govt. UP school is the only school in the village. Nearby villages are Vayala, Kadaplamattam, Kalikavu, and Marangattupally.

Etymology
As the name depicts, Elackad (in Malayalam it means 'forest of leaves') is a forest kind of village. It has road facility, school facilities and library. The main income of the people here is through farming.

References

Villages in Kottayam district